Ustyatavka (Atawtamaq) is a rural locality (a village) in Taymeyevsky Selsoviet, Salavatsky District, Bashkortostan, Russia. The population was 136 as of 2010. There are 2 streets.

Geography 
Ustyatavka is located 51 km northwest of Maloyaz (the district's administrative centre) by road. Urmantau is the nearest rural locality.

References 

Rural localities in Salavatsky District